Zephyrus, according to the apocryphal Letter to Aristotle 14, was the soldier, who brought Alexander the Great a helmet full of water when the army was suffering greatly in the Gedrosian desert (325 BC). The famous story of how Alexander poured the water into the ground in front of the army is told by a number of sources but the name Zephyrus (western wind) appears to have been invented.

References
Who's who in the age of Alexander the Great 

4th-century BC people
Soldiers of Alexander the Great